Sansara is a genus of moths in the family of Cossidae.

Species
 Sansara dea (Yakovlev, 2006)
 Sansara hreblayi Yakovlev, 2004
 Sansara naumanni Yakovlev, 2004
 Sansara pallidalae (Hampson, 1892)

References

 , 2004: Cossidae of Thailand. Part 2. (Lepidoptera: Cossidae). Atalanta 35 (3-4): 383–389.
 , 2009: New taxa of African and Asian Cossidae (Lepidoptera). Euroasian Entomological Journal 8 (3): 353–361. Full article: .

External links
Natural History Museum Lepidoptera generic names catalog

Zeuzerinae